The 2021 NAPA Auto Care 150 was a ARCA Menards Series West race held on October 9, 2021. It was contested over 158 laps—extended from 150 laps due to an overtime finish—on the  short track oval. It was the eighth race of the 2021 ARCA Menards Series West season. Pedroncelli Racing driver P. J. Pedroncelli, collected his first win of the season, and of his career.

Background

Entry list 

 (R) denotes rookie driver.
 (i) denotes driver who is ineligible for series driver points.

Practice/Qualifying 
Practice and qualifying were combined into 1 75-minute session, where the fastest lap counted as the driver's qualifying lap.

Starting Lineups

Race

Race results

References 

2021 in sports in California
NAPA Auto Care 150
2021 ARCA Menards Series West